Laura Shapiro Kramer is an American author, producer and film maker.

Personal life

Born and raised in Boston, Massachusetts, Shapiro Kramer left New England to attend the University of Wisconsin–Madison in the 1960s.  In 1969 she moved to Los Angeles where she attended UCLA studying film and art history. In 1979, she married Jay Kramer, an attorney.

Career
In 1975 Shapiro Kramer began working with Steve Leber and David Krebs.  Working with Leber and Krebs, Shapiro Kramer helped them manage the first national tour of Jesus Christ Superstar from 1976 to 1980.

In 1991 after publishing an article about the Feldenkrais method in Family Circle, Shapiro Kramer was a guest on The Oprah Winfrey Show. In 1995 Shapiro Kramer published the memoir Uncommon Voyage about her experiences parenting a child with special needs. The book had a second edition in 2002. Shapiro Kramer reworked the story of raising  her son into a guidebook for other parents and in 2017 it was published digitally. This new edition, titled Uncommon Voyage: Parenting Children with Special Needs, A Guidebook, received praise from Publishers Weekly.

Shapiro Kramer sold David Mamet's first tele-play ''Smashville to ABC in 1991 and developed Scramble with Richard Wesley for Universal Pictures. In 1983 Shapiro Kramer produced John Byrne's Slab Boys on Broadway directed by Robert Allan Ackerman and starring Sean Penn, Kevin Bacon, Val Kilmer and Madeline Potter.  Her production won an Outer Critics Circle Award for Ackerman. She was part of the producing team of Amerika starring Madeline Kahn at the Santa Fe Festival Theater and with other play productions at the Berkshire Theater Festival in Stockbridge, Massachusetts.
 
Kramer was an independent consultant for Friends of Bezalel, the National Academy of Arts and Design in Jerusalem, and The Sculptors Guild.

In 2013 and 2014 Kramer's articles about her travels began appearing in newspapers like The Forward who published the articles with her photos about Tasmania (2013) and Iran (2014).

In November 2005 Shapiro Kramer published "Laura and Myriam's Incredible Albanian Vacation" in Illyria, an Albanian/American newspaper from Bardha Publications.  The article described her travels to Albania, Kosovo, and the Balkans and the documentary film Shqiperi she was producing through NYFA, the New York Foundation for the Arts where she was the Project Director for The Albyon Project.

Not-for-profit
Shapiro Kramer was chair of the board of Resources for Children with Special Needs from 1995 - 2005. The organization is now known as INCLUDEnyc.  She has also been on the board of directors for the New York City Outward Bound Center and the Iyengar Yoga Association of Greater New York where she is Founder and chair of the advisory board.

References

Living people
1948 births
Film producers from Massachusetts
American memoirists
American travel writers
American women travel writers
Writers from Boston
Jewish American writers
21st-century American Jews
21st-century American women